Aay Tobe Sohochori is a 2021 Indian Bengali language television series that premiered on 13 September 2021 on Star Jalsha and it also available on the digital platform Disney+ Hotstar. The show is produced by Sahana Dutta of Missing Crew Productions and stars Koneenica Banerjee and Arunima Haldar.

Plot 

Aay Tobe Sohochori is the story of friendship between two persons with vast difference in ages, Sohochori and Borfi. It highlights the fulfillment of dreams of a mid-aged women to study and become a gold-medalist, by overcoming all barriers of family and society.

Cast

Main 
 Koneenica Banerjee as Sohochori "Soi" Gupta – Sudhanshu's daughter; Samaresh's ex-wife; Tipu's mother; Borfi's best friend  (2021 – 2022)
 Arunima Haldar as Ranjini "Borfi" Sarkar Sengupta – Hirak's daughter; Debina's half-sister; Rumki and Jhumki's cousin; Tipu's wife; Sohochori's best friend (2021 – 2022)  
Indrajit Chakraborty as Samaresh "Somu" Sengupta – Mrinalini's eldest son; Tuban, Pola, Koli and Bubai's brother; Sohochori's ex-husband; Tipu's father; Debina's love interest (2021 – 2022)
Indranil Chatterjee as Roudro "Tipu" Sengupta – Sohochori and Samaresh's son; Ruby's cousin; Borfi's husband (2021 – 2022)
Kuyasha Biswas as Debina "Binti" Sarkar Sengupta – Hirak and Raka's daughter; Borfi's half-sister; Samaresh's love interest; Bubai's wife; Sohochori's rival (2021 – 2022)

Recurring
Arindya Banerjee as Aryan "Bubai" Sengupta – Mrinalini's youngest son; Samaresh, Tuban, Pola and Koli's brother; Debina's husband (2021 – 2022)
Manoj Pal as Sudhanshu Gupta – Sohochori's father; Tipu's grandfather (2021 – 2022)
Chhanda Chatterjee as Mrinalini Sengupta – Samaresh, Tuban, Pola, Koli and Bubai's mother; Tipu and Ruby's grandmother (2021 – 2022)
Animesh Bhaduri as Pulokesh "Tuban" Sengupta – Mrinalini's second son; Samaresh, Pola, Koli and Bubai's brother; Bonya's husband; Ruby's father.(2021 – 2022)
Ankita Majhi as Mohona "Bonya" Sengupta – Borfi's school principal; Tuban's wife; Ruby's mother (2021 – 2022)
Archika Gupta as Ruby Sengupta – Bonya and Tuban's daughter; Tipu's cousin (2021 – 2022)
Nabanita Dutta as Pola Sengupta – Mrinalini's elder daughter; Samaresh, Tubai, Koli and Bubai's sister (2021 – 2022)
Aemila Sadhukhan as Koli Sengupta – Mrinalini's younger daughter; Samaresh, Tubai, Pola and Bubai's sister (2021)
Devendranath Chhat as Mainak Basak – Kishore's friend; Renu's husband; Rumki and Jhumki's father; Borfi's uncle (2021 – 2022)
Arijita Mukhopadhyay as Renu Basak – Mainak's wife; Rumki and Jhumki's mother; Borfi's aunt (2021 – 2022)
Soumi Ghosh as Rumki Basak – Mainak and Renu's elder daughter; Jhumki's sister; Borfi's cousin (2021)
Alokananda Guha as Jhumki Basak – Mainak and Renu's younger daughter; Rumki's sister; Borfi's cousin (2021)
Sujoy Prasad Chatterjee as Hirak Sarkar – Raka's husband; Debina and Borfi's father (2022)
Ankita Roy as Kajol – Sengupta's maid (2021–present)
Nabanita Mazumder as Chopola – Borfi's house maid (2021)
Arghya Mukherjee as Kishore – Principal of Sohochori's college; Mainak's friend (2021 – 2022)
Suman Das as Professor Pakrashi (2021)
Samir Biswas as priest (2021)
Tanushree Saha as Sondhya (2022)
Monoj Ojha as Abhishek Dutta Chowdhury aka ADC – Sohochori and Tuban's former boss; Pola's love interest (2022)

Reception

TRP Ratings

References

External links 
 Aay Tobe Sohochori at Disney+ Hotstar

Indian drama television series
2021 Indian television series debuts
Star Jalsha original programming
2022 Indian television series endings
Bengali-language television programming in India